Krishnagiri Fort is one of the strongest forts in the Krishnagiri district and is now one of the monuments protected by the Archaeological Survey of India. The fort and the surrounding areas, then called "Baramahal", were given to Jagadevarayar by the Vijayanagar for his valour in the wars. Jagadevarayar made Jagadevi his capital.

In the 17th century the fort  and Baramahal were occupied by Bijapur Sultanate and it was given to Shahji as jagir. Shahji made Bangalore his headquarters and ruled these areas. After the death of Shahji, his younger son Vyankoji (Ekoji) became the ruler. In the 1670s Chatrapati Shivaji captured this fort from his younger brother Vyankoji during his Deccan expedition.

In the 18th century Hyder Ali captured this fort and Baramahal on the instruction of Chikka Devaraja Wodeyar, king of Mysore. Later, Hyder Ali retained these areas when he got separated from the king of Mysore and made his own capital Srirangapatna. In 1768 this fort surrendered to the British after a long blockade in the First Anglo-Mysore war. In November 1791 British troops under Lt. Col. Maxwell attacked the fort, during the third Anglo-Mysore war, resulting in 50 British casualties. With almost all their officers wounded or dead they were forced to retreat. The fort remained in Tipu Sultan’s  possession until the Treaty of Srirangapatna in 1792 which ceded it to the British.

Gallery

References

Government's Krishnagiri District website

Krishnagiri Fort